Anghel Iordănescu (born 4 May 1950), also known as "Tata Puiu", is a Romanian former footballer and former manager of the Romania national team, who played as a forward. In 2007, Iordănescu retired from football, and the following February, after his predecessor resigned, he became a member of the Romanian Senate, sitting on the Social Democratic Party benches. On 26 December 2011, he became an independent senator, affiliated to the National Union for the Progress of Romania.
His son, Edward Iordănescu, is also a former footballer and current manager.

Club career
One of Steaua București's greatest players, Iordănescu was a forward or attacking midfielder with a well-developed scoring technique and uncommon dribbling ability. He was also well known for his vision and set-piece ability. In Romania, he played only for Steaua, a team he joined as a youth in 1962, aged 12. Six years later, he made his debut for the first team, followed by his first appearance for the Romania national team in 1971. During this period, he scored 155 goals, becoming the team's highest ever goalscorer.

Iordănescu won two league championships (in 1976 and 1978) and four Cupa Romaniei (in 1970, 1971, 1976, and 1979). In 1981–82, he was Divizia A's top goalscorer.

In 1982, aged 32, Iordănescu left Romania to play for OFI Crete in Greece under head coach Les Shannon, but returned to Steaua two years later to become the club's assistant manager. Together with Emerich Jenei, then head coach, he won the championship in 1985 and helped lead the team to its European Cup triumph in 1986, playing as a substitute in the final against Barcelona.

International career
Iordănescu made his international debut on 22 September 1971 against Finland and scored the opening goal of a 4-0 win. The highlight of his international career came in the 1977-80 Balkan Cup, when he scored a hat-trick in the second leg of the final to defeat Yugoslavia 4-3 on aggregate and give Romania a record-breaking fourth title (Bulgaria won 3 times), and subsequently being the tournament's top goal scorer with 6 goals.

International goals
Romania's goal tally first.

Coaching career
Emerich Jenei was appointed as Romania's manager in the summer of 1986, leaving Iordănescu as Steaua's new head coach. From his new position, he led his side to victory in three championships (1987, 1988 and 1989) as well as three Cupa Romaniei in the same years. At international level, Steaua and Iordănescu reached the European Cup semi-final in 1988 and the final one year later.

In 1990, he left Steaua for the second time as he signed a two-year contract with Cypriot club Anorthosis Famagusta. After being released from his contract, he returned to Steaua in 1992 to lead the club to the UEFA Cup Winners' Cup quarter-finals in 1993, and then a new league championship.

In the summer of 1993, he was asked to replace Cornel Dinu as Romania's coach and managed to lead the team to qualification for the 1994 FIFA World Cup, where Romania reached the quarter-finals, the best-ever performance of Romanian football at the national team level. He continued as Romania's coach after the World Cup and led the team to a new qualification, for UEFA Euro 1996 and the 1998 World Cup, where Romania reached the knockout stage as winners of Group G.

However, although he had led the team to a new qualification for a World Cup, Iordănescu was harshly criticized by the media, with some journalists accusing him of the low level of the team during the process. After losing against Croatia in the second round of the 1998 World Cup, he resigned and took over the managerial position of Greece, from where he would be sacked in 1999 after Greece failed to qualify for Euro 2000.

In the 1999–2000 season, Iordănescu was appointed head coach of Saudi club Al-Hilal, where he won the Saudi Crown Prince Cup and the Asian Club Championship (the forerunner to the AFC Champions League). Despite these performances, he left the club to lead Rapid București. He led Rapid to the first round of the 2000–01 UEFA Cup, losing 1–0 on aggregate to eventual winners Liverpool. However, he was sacked after only three months, after which he signed with Emirati club Al Ain, guiding them to UAE President's Cup title.

After Romania failed to qualify for the 2002 World Cup, Iordănescu was asked to replace Gheorghe Hagi, thereby becoming the national football team's coach for the second time. His main objective was to qualify the team for Euro 2004, but failed to do so. Saying that there was no one else both better than he and available to take charge of the national team, the Romanian Football Federation gave him credit for the 2006 World Cup qualifying stage, but after a poor performance away against Armenia, he was finally sacked.

After his second stint as Romania's coach, Iordănescu returned to Saudi Arabia to manage Al-Ittihad, with whom he won his second AFC Champions League (in 2005) and the Arab Champions League, but one year later was sacked after drawing with Al-Ettifaq. Just as the 2006–07 UAE League season began, Iordănescu returned to coach Al Ain for a few months before announcing his retirement from professional football.

In October 2014, Iordănescu came out of retirement to take charge of Romania for a third time. On 27 June 2016, he resigned as Romania coach after an unsuccessful Euro 2016 finals campaign, finishing last place in Group A with just one point earned, from a 1–1 draw with Switzerland.

Career honours

Player
Steaua București

Romanian League: 1975–76, 1977–78
Cupa României: 1969–70, 1970–71, 1975–76, 1978–79
European Cup: 1985–86

Romania
Balkan Cup: 1977–80

Manager
Steaua București

Romanian League: 1986–87, 1987–88, 1988–89, 1992–93
Romanian Cup: 1986–87, 1988–89
Intercontinental Cup: Runner-up 1986
European Super Cup: 1986
European Cup: Runner-up 1988–89

Al-Hilal
AFC Champions League: 1999–00
Saudi Crown Prince Cup: 1999–00
Gulf Club Champions Cup: Runner-up 2000

Al Ain
UAE President's Cup: 2001

Al-Ittihad
AFC Champions League: 2005
UAFA Arab Champions League: 2005

Managerial statistics

See also
List of UEFA Super Cup winning managers
List of Asian Cup and AFC Champions League winning managers

References

External links

1950 births
Living people
Footballers from Bucharest
Romanian football managers
Romanian footballers
Romania international footballers
Romanian expatriate footballers
Liga I players
Super League Greece players
FC Steaua București players
OFI Crete F.C. players
Expatriate footballers in Greece
FC Steaua București managers
Ittihad FC managers
Expatriate football managers in Cyprus
FC Steaua București assistant managers
FC Rapid București managers
1994 FIFA World Cup managers
UEFA Euro 1996 managers
1998 FIFA World Cup managers
Association football forwards
Greece national football team managers
Al Hilal SFC managers
Members of the Senate of Romania
Social Democratic Party (Romania) politicians
Romanian sportsperson-politicians
Anorthosis Famagusta F.C. managers
Romanian expatriate sportspeople in Greece
Al Ain FC managers
Expatriate football managers in Greece
Expatriate football managers in Saudi Arabia
Expatriate football managers in the United Arab Emirates
Romanian expatriate football managers
Romania national football team managers
Romanian expatriate sportspeople in Cyprus
UEFA Euro 2016 managers